Wielkie Stwolno  (German: Deutsch Westphalen) is a village in the administrative district of Gmina Dragacz, within Świecie County, Kuyavian-Pomeranian Voivodeship, in north-central Poland.

References

Villages in Świecie County